Maga may refer to the following people:
Given name
Maga of Characene, a 2nd-century king in the Middle East
Maga Bo, American Brazilian DJ, producer, sound engineer and ethnomusicologist
Magà Ettori (born 1972), Corsican filmmaker
Maga Magazinović (1882–1968), Serbian was a librarian and journalist
Maga.Tamizh Prabhagaran, Indian Tamil journalist and documentary film maker

Surname
 Hubert Maga (1916–2000), Dahomean politician (Benin)
Othmar Mága (1929–2020), German music conductor
Zoltán Mága (born 1974), Hungarian violinist

See also
Maga (disambiguation)